The Fencing Competition at the 2009 Mediterranean Games was held in Pescara, Italy.

Medallists

Men's Competition

Individual Epée

Women's competition

Individual Epée

Individual Foil

Individual Sabre

Medal table

References
 Results

M
Sports at the 2009 Mediterranean Games
2009
International fencing competitions hosted by Italy